The 2018 AFC Futsal Club Championship was an international futsal tournament held in Indonesia from 1 to 12 August 2018. The 16 clubs involved in the tournament were required to register a squad of 14 players, minimum two of whom must be goalkeepers (Regulations Articles 30.1 and 30.2). Only players in these squads were eligible to take part in the tournament.

The position listed for each player is per the squad list in the official match reports by the AFC. The age listed for each player is on 1 August 2018, the first day of the tournament. Flags indicate national team as defined under FIFA eligibility rules. Players may hold more than one non-FIFA nationality. A flag is included for coaches that are of a different nationality than their own national team.

Group A

Vamos Mataram
Manager:  Reza Falahzadeh

Nagoya Oceans
Manager:  Pedro Costa

Dalian Yuan Dynasty
Manager: Li Jianlei

Victoria University College
Manager: Htay Myint

Group B

Thái Sơn Nam
Manager:  Miguel Rodrigo

Al-Dhafrah
Manager:  Luis Fonseca Cilleros

Naft Al-Wasat
Manager: Haitham Abbas Bawei

Jeonju MAG
Manager: Lee Young-jin

Group C

Chonburi Bluewave
Manager: Rakphol Sainetngamwas

Al-Sailiya
Manager:  João

Osh EREM
Manager: Daniiar Abdraimov

Vic Vipers
Manager: Miltiadis Sakkos

Group D

Mes Sungun
Manager: Hamid Bigham

Bank of Beirut
Manager:  Dejan Đedović

AGMK
Manager: Aleksandr Petrov

Sipar Khujand
Manager:  Benyamin Eghbali

References

External links
 Official AFC Futsal Club Championship website

Club Championship squads